Sir Lancelot Hare (7 December 1851 – 7 October 1922) was a British civil servant and former Lieutenant Governor of the Bengal province of the British Raj.

Early life
Hare was born in London, Britain. He was educated at the City of London School.

Career
Hare joined the Indian Civil Service in 1873 at Bengal. In 1900 he was awarded CIE. He worked at a number of districts of Bengal and was promoted to the Governors council. On 20 August 1906, Bampfylde Fuller resigned following the uproar over the Partition of Bengal and Hare was appointed the governor of East Bengal and Assam. In 1906 he was awarded CSI and in 1907 KCSI.

Death and legacy
Hare died on 7 October 1922. A street in Dhaka is named after him.

References

1851 births
1922 deaths
Lieutenant-governors of Bengal
Indian Civil Service (British India) officers